Phoenicoprocta partheni is a moth of the subfamily Arctiinae. It was described by Johan Christian Fabricius in 1793. It is found on Haiti.

References

 

Euchromiina
Moths described in 1793